Air Forbes Won (April 13, 1979 - November 19, 2009) is an American Thoroughbred racehorse and the winner of the 1982 Wood Memorial Stakes.

Career

Air Forbes Won's first race was on March 4, 1982 at the Aqueduct, where he came in 1st. He won his next race on March 20, 1982 which was also at the Aqueduct.

He won his first graded race at the 1982 Gotham Stakes. He then won the 1982 Wood Memorial Stakes, which was the last race of his four race win streak.

He competed in the 1982 Kentucky Derby, coming in 7th place.

On June 20, 1982 Air Forbes Won competed for the last time in the Ohio Derby during which he suffered a tendon injury and was retired.

Air Forbes Won was euthanized on November 19, 2009 at the age of 30 due to complications from old age.

Stud career
Air Forbes Won's descendants include:

c = colt, f = filly

Pedigree

References

1979 racehorse births
2009 racehorse deaths
Racehorses trained in the United States
Thoroughbred family 14-a